Irony is a literary or rhetorical device, in which there is an incongruity or discordance between what one says or does.

Irony or Ironic may also refer to:

 On the Concept of Irony with Continual Reference to Socrates, an 1841 philosophical dissertation on irony by Danish philosopher Søren Kierkegaard
 Irony mark, a proposed punctuation mark
 Irony (framework), a framework for .NET language implementation
 Telba Irony, Brazilian statistician
 Irony display, see Kitsch

Music
 Ironik (born 1988), British musician born James Christian Charters
 Irony (album), a 2003 electronic album
 Irony, album by Sungha Jung
 Irony, album by Kevin Field
 "Irony" (Wonder Girls song)
 "Irony" (ClariS song)
 "Ironic" (song), a 1996 song by Alanis Morissette
 "Ironically", a song by The Doubleclicks